Cesare Antonio Gasperoni (born 1944) was one of the two Captains Regent of San Marino from 1 October 1990 to 1 April 1991 and from 1 April 2005 to 1 October 2005.

Gasperoni is a member of the San Marinese Christian Democratic Party (PDCS).

Notes

1944 births
Living people
Captains Regent of San Marino
Members of the Grand and General Council
Politicians of Catholic political parties
Sammarinese Christian Democratic Party politicians